Beryno Jiann Tze Wong (born 4 June 1986) is a Malaysian male badminton player.

Achievements

BWF International Challenge/Series
Men's Singles

 BWF International Challenge tournament
 BWF International Series tournament
 BWF Future Series tournament

References

External links
 

1986 births
Living people
Malaysian male badminton players
Malaysian sportspeople of Chinese descent
21st-century Malaysian people